Chudamani is a type of hair ornament.

Chudamani may also refer to:

Chudamani Khadka, Nepali politician
Chudamani Raghavan, Indian writer
Chudamani Vihara, Indian monastery